A House of Happiness is a 2018 Malaysian Cantonese-language film directed by JY Teng.

References

External links 

2018 films
2010s Cantonese-language films
Malaysian comedy films
2018 comedy films